José Antonio Urquijo (born 16 December 1960) is a Chilean former track cyclist. He competed in the sprint event at the 1984 Summer Olympics.

References

1960 births
Living people
Chilean male cyclists
Olympic cyclists of Chile
Cyclists at the 1984 Summer Olympics
Place of birth missing (living people)
Pan American Games medalists in cycling
20th-century Chilean people
21st-century Chilean people
Pan American Games bronze medalists for Chile
Medalists at the 1983 Pan American Games